Miguel Palencia Calvo (born 2 January 1984) is a Spanish retired footballer who played as a right back.

Club career
Born in Madrid, Palencia joined local Real Madrid at the age of ten. In May 2002, he made his professional debut with the reserves Real Madrid Castilla in Segunda División B, going on to appear in four full seasons with the team.

In the 2004–05 campaign, Palencia played twice with the main squad, his debut coming on 26 February 2005 in a 2–0 La Liga loss at Deportivo de La Coruña. Two weeks later, in another away fixture for the same competition, he appeared against Getafe CF (1–2 defeat) and, in the ensuing summer, left the Santiago Bernabéu Stadium and signed with R.E. Mouscron in Belgium.

After one unassuming season in the Pro League, Palencia returned to Spain, joining Getafe's B-side. In 2009, he moved to CF Atlético Ciudad of the third level, but the club was declared bankrupt in August of the following year.

In early October 2010, Palencia signed with amateurs Las Rozas CF in his hometown, his debut coming on the 14th against UD San Sebastián de los Reyes in the Copa Federación de España's qualifying rounds. In the following transfer window, however, he returned to division three, joining Orihuela CF.

Honours
Spain U16
UEFA European Under-16 Championship: 2001

References

External links

1984 births
Living people
Footballers from Madrid
Spanish footballers
Association football defenders
La Liga players
Segunda División players
Segunda División B players
Tercera División players
Real Madrid C footballers
Real Madrid Castilla footballers
Real Madrid CF players
Getafe CF B players
Las Rozas CF players
Orihuela CF players
Belgian Pro League players
Royal Excel Mouscron players
Spain youth international footballers
Spanish expatriate footballers
Expatriate footballers in Belgium
Spanish expatriate sportspeople in Belgium